Valentino Musetti (born 7 January 1943 in Pontremoli, Tuscany, Italy), often known as just Val Musetti, is an Italian-born English film and TV stuntman and retired motor racing driver. Highlights of his career include finishing third in the Shellsport International Series in 1977. In 1978 he finished fifth in the Aurora F1 Championship. In the late 1980s he drove in the FIA World Sportscar Championship. He competed in one round of the 1991 British Touring Car Championship at Donington Park. With a privately entered BMW M3, he finished in thirteenth place. That year he also entered the 24 Hours of Le Mans, but his team failed to qualify.

He has appeared in many TV programmes since the 1960s, such as The Avengers, Callan, Doctor Who (credited in the TV serial The Crusade), Space: 1999, The Professionals, Minder and Dempsey and Makepeace. He has worked as a stuntman on many TV programmes and films such as The Italian Job, The New Avengers, Superman II, An American Werewolf in London, Robin Hood: Prince of Thieves, Alien 3 and Midsomer Murders among others.

Filmography

Racing record

Complete Shellsport International Series results
(key) (Races in bold indicate pole position; races in italics indicate fastest lap)

Complete European Formula Two Championship results
(key) (Races in bold indicate pole position; races in italics indicate fastest lap)

Complete British Formula One Championship results
(key) (note: results shown in bold indicate pole position; results in italics indicate fastest lap)

Complete Formula One Non-Championship results
(key)

Complete International Formula 3000 results
(key) (Races in bold indicate pole position; races in italics indicate fastest lap.)

Complete World Sportscar Championship results
(key) (Races in bold indicate pole position) (Races in italics indicate fastest lap)

24 Hours of Le Mans results

Complete British Touring Car Championship results
(key) (Races in bold indicate pole position) (Races in italics indicate fastest lap)

Complete British GT Championship results
(key) (Races in bold indicate pole position) (Races in italics indicate fastest lap)

References

External links
 

1943 births
Living people
English racing drivers
English Formula One drivers
British Formula One Championship drivers
British Touring Car Championship drivers
English male film actors
English stunt performers
English male television actors
Italian emigrants to the United Kingdom
English people of Italian descent
British Formula Three Championship drivers
24 Hours of Le Mans drivers
International Formula 3000 drivers
World Sportscar Championship drivers
British GT Championship drivers